The third season of the American crime thriller television series The Blacklist premiered on NBC on October 1, 2015 and concluded on May 19, 2016. The season consisted of 23 episodes. The season was produced by Davis Entertainment, Universal Television, and Sony Pictures Television, and the executive producers were Jon Bokenkamp, John Davis, John Eisendrath, John Fox, and Joe Carnahan.

Premise 
The third season sees Liz and Reddington on the run from the government and the Task Force.  The first part of the season explores The Cabal's efforts to capture Liz and Reddington and their efforts to clear Liz's name. The Cabal is represented by the ruthless Director of the National Clandestine Service Peter Kotsiopulos (David Strathairn). The season also introduces Susan "Scottie" Hargrave (Famke Janssen), the mother of Tom Keen, Mattias Solomon (Edi Gathegi) and Nez Rowan (Tawny Cypress), key characters for the spin-off series The Blacklist: Redemption, focusing on Tom and Scottie Hargrave. The final episodes of the season also introduce a new series antagonist Alexander Kirk, AKA Konstantin Rostov, who claims to be Liz's father and will stop at nothing to protect her and win her loyalty. An important subplot for the season is Liz's pregnancy and Mr. Kaplan's (Susan Blommaert) efforts to protect Liz and Tom's daughter from Reddington.

Cast

Main
 James Spader as Raymond Reddington
 Megan Boone as Elizabeth Keen
 Diego Klattenhoff as Donald Ressler 
 Ryan Eggold as Tom Keen
 Harry Lennix as Harold Cooper
 Amir Arison as Aram Mojtabai
 Mozhan Marnò as Samar Navabi
 Hisham Tawfiq as Dembe Zuma

Recurring
 Susan Blommaert as Mr. Kaplan.
 Deidre Lovejoy as Cynthia Panabaker.
 David Strathairn as Peter Kotsiopulos, the Director of the National Clandestine Service.
 Edi Gathegi as Matias Solomon, a Cabal operative sent to hunt down Reddington.
 Adriane Lenox as Deputy Attorney General Reven Wright, the Department of Justice liaison to the Task Force.
 Christine Lahti as Laurel Hitchin, National Security Advisor and chairman of the commission tasked with investigating the OREA bombing.
 Margarita Levieva as Gina Zanetakos, a corporate terrorist turned master criminal who recruits Tom for a heist.
 Andrew Divoff as Karakurt, a Russian assassin responsible for the OREA bombing and killing of Senator Hawkins.
 Fisher Stevens as Marvin Gerard, Reddington's lawyer.
 Peter Vack as Asher Sutton, a socialite whom Tom Keen exploits to track Karakurt.
 Paul Reubens as Mr. Vargas, Reddington's double agent.
 Tony Plana as Mr. Diaz, the Venezuelan Foreign Minister whom Reddington asks for help.
 Conor Leslie as Gwen Hollander, Asher Sutton's girlfriend.
 Clark Middleton as Glen Carter, a DMV employee occasionally employed by Reddington.
 Ned van Zandt as Leonard Caul, an operative of Reddington's and an expert on computer security.
 Tawny Cypress as Nez Rowan, a mercenary.
 Famke Janssen as Susan "Scottie" Hargrave and the mother of Tom Keen.
 Ulrich Thomsen as Alexander Kirk/Konstantin Rostov, the man claiming to be Liz's father.
 Benito Martinez as Senator Robert Diaz, a presidential candidate being supported by Alexander Kirk.
 Murphy Guyer as The Eye in the Sky.
 Piter Marek as Nik, Liz's former boyfriend and Reddington's emergency doctor.
 Raoul Trujillo as Mato, a hitman employed by Alexander Kirk.

Episodes

Production 
Hisham Tawfiq, who plays Red's body man, Dembe Zuma, was promoted to series regular beginning with Season 3.

Potential spin-off
Episode 22 was written by Bokenkamp and Eisendrath and directed by Michael Dinner as a potential spin-off of the series. It aired on May 12, 2016.
The spin-off was ordered titled The Blacklist: Redemption.

Reception 
The third season of The Blacklist received positive reviews from critics. The review aggregator website Rotten Tomatoes reports a 93% approval rating based on 14 reviews, with an average score of 7.41/10. The consensus reads: "The Blacklist is back in top form with fresh dangers that put Red on the ropes while giving James Spader room to shine".

Ratings

References

External links
 
 

2015 American television seasons
2016 American television seasons
3